Aneta Sylwia Stodolna is a Polish physicist known for being the first person to successfully use a quantum microscope to image electrons in a hydrogen atom.

Stodolna earned her Ph.D. from Radboud University in 2014.

References 

21st-century Polish physicists
Polish women physicists
Year of birth missing (living people)
Living people
Radboud University Nijmegen alumni